Beach Cities Transit provides mass transportation for the Los Angeles beach city suburbs of Redondo Beach, Hermosa Beach, Manhattan Beach, and El Segundo. The two routes provide both local service and afford a variety of opportunities to connect with the rest of the Greater Los Angeles Transportation grid. The system began in 2005, taking over lower-ridership routes from Los Angeles Metro.

Routes

102 
Route 102 travels between Redondo Beach station and the Redondo Beach Pier, via the South Bay Galleria/Redondo Beach Transit Center, the Artesia Boulevard Business District, Beach Cities Health District, Redondo Union High School and Redondo Beach Civic Center. Service operates daily from 6 am to 8 pm on 30 to 45 minute headways. This line was created when Los Angeles Metro Bus line 215 was shortened to the Redondo Beach station.

109 
Route 109 travels between the LAX City Bus Center and Redondo Beach Riviera Village, via Aviation/LAX station, El Segundo, Plaza El Segundo, Douglas station, Manhattan Village, Manhattan Beach, Hermosa Beach Pier and the Redondo Beach Pier. Service operates daily from 6 am to 10 pm on 40 to 50 minute headways. This line was created when Metro Express line 439 was shortened to Aviation Station.

Fleet

References 

Public transportation in Los Angeles County, California
Bus transportation in California
Transportation in Los Angeles County, California
Redondo Beach, California